Cavadini is an Italian surname. People with this surname include:

Alessandro Cavadini (active 1970s–), Australian filmmaker, director of the documentary Protected (1975)
Auguste Cavadini (1865–?), a French sport shooter
Fabio Cavadini, Australian filmmaker, of Frontyard Films (2000–)
Catherine Cavadini, American voice actress

Italian-language surnames